The International Convention Concerning the Use of Broadcasting in the Cause of Peace is a 1936 League of Nations treaty whereby states agreed to prohibit the use of broadcasting for propaganda or the spreading of false news. It was the first international treaty to bind states to "restrict expression which constituted a threat to international peace and security".

Creation
In 1933, the Assembly of the League of Nations authorised the drafting of a multilateral treaty on propaganda. The Convention resulted and it was concluded and signed on 23 September 1936 at a conference in Geneva, Switzerland. The Convention entered into force on 2 April 1938.

Content
Article 1 of the Convention obligates the state parties to prohibit and stop any broadcast transmissions within their territories that are "of such a character as to incite the population of any territory to acts incompatible with the internal order or the security of a territory"; this article was intended to prohibit and stop propaganda from being broadcast that would incite listeners to revolution.

Article 2 of the Convention contains a similar mandate by prohibiting broadcasts that would constitute "incitement to war against another high contracting party". The Article makes no distinction between the speech of the state and the speech of private individuals.

Articles 3 and 4 prohibits the broadcasting of false news, and Article 5 states that parties to the agreement will, upon request, provide information to foreign broadcasting services that can be used to promote knowledge and understanding of the "civilization and conditions of life of his own country".

History of legacy
Upon the outbreak of the Second World War, there were 22 parties to the Convention. The effect of the Convention was severely limited by the fact that Germany, Italy, and Japan‒states which waged extensive propaganda campaigns throughout the 1930s and World War II–were not parties to the Convention. Significantly, China, the United States, and the Soviet Union also chose to not ratify the Convention, the U.S. on First Amendment grounds.

After the Second World War, depositary functions for the Convention passed from the League of Nations to the 
United Nations. In 1954, the United Nations General Assembly recognised that the Convention "was an important element in the field of freedom of information". The General Assembly authorised the drafting of a Protocol which would supplement and update the Convention; however, when the draft Protocol attracted little support, the UN "abandoned all efforts at reviving the Convention".

Beginning in the 1960s, the Convention continued to be ratified by a few states, particularly those in the Communist bloc. However, during the 1980s, it was denounced by Australia, France, the Netherlands, and the United Kingdom. It was most recently ratified by Liberia in 2005. As of 2013, it is in force for 29 states.

Signatories and state parties
The following states became parties to the Convention by ratifying, acceding to, or declaring succession to it. Parties that signed the Convention on 23 September 1936 are indicated in bold. Parties that have subsequently denounced the Convention are indicated and the date of ratification is in italics.

The other states that signed the Convention but have not ratified it are Albania, Argentina, Austria, Belgium, Colombia, Dominican Republic, Greece, Lithuania, Mexico, Romania, Spain, Turkey, and Uruguay.

Notes

External links
Text, League of Nations Treaty Series
Treaty status, at depositary

International Convention concerning the Use of Broadcasting in the Cause of Peace
International Convention concerning the Use of Broadcasting in the Cause of Peace
League of Nations treaties
International Convention concerning the Use of Broadcasting in the Cause of Peace
Telecommunications treaties
Treaties concluded in 1936
Treaties entered into force in 1938
Treaties of the Democratic Republic of Afghanistan
Treaties of Vargas-era Brazil
Treaties of the People's Republic of Bulgaria
Treaties of Cameroon
Treaties of Chile
Treaties of Czechoslovakia
Treaties of Denmark
Treaties of the Kingdom of Egypt
Treaties of El Salvador
Treaties of Estonia
Treaties of Finland
Treaties of East Germany
Treaties of Guatemala
Treaties of the Holy See
Treaties of the Hungarian People's Republic
Treaties of British India
Treaties of the Irish Free State
Treaties of the Kingdom of Laos
Treaties of Latvia
Treaties of Liberia
Treaties of Luxembourg
Treaties of Malta
Treaties of Mauritius
Treaties of the Mongolian People's Republic
Treaties of New Zealand
Treaties of Norway
Treaties of the Union of South Africa
Treaties of the Soviet Union
Treaties of Sweden
Treaties of Switzerland
Treaties of Zimbabwe
Treaties extended to the Territory of New Guinea
Treaties extended to the Territory of Papua
Treaties extended to the Nauru Trust Territory
Treaties extended to the Faroe Islands
Treaties extended to Greenland
Treaties extended to French Algeria
Treaties extended to French Cameroon
Treaties extended to French Madagascar
Treaties extended to French Equatorial Africa
Treaties extended to French India
Treaties extended to French Indochina
Treaties extended to French Morocco
Treaties extended to French Somaliland
Treaties extended to the French Mandate for Syria and the Lebanon
Treaties extended to French Togoland
Treaties extended to the French Protectorate of Tunisia
Treaties extended to French West Africa
Treaties extended to the Dutch East Indies
Treaties extended to Surinam (Dutch colony)
Treaties extended to British Burma
Treaties extended to Southern Rhodesia
Treaties extended to the Colony of Aden
Treaties extended to the Colony of the Bahamas
Treaties extended to the Colony of Barbados
Treaties extended to Basutoland
Treaties extended to the Bechuanaland Protectorate
Treaties extended to British Guiana
Treaties extended to British Honduras
Treaties extended to British Ceylon
Treaties extended to British Cyprus
Treaties extended to the Colony of Fiji
Treaties extended to the Gambia Colony and Protectorate
Treaties extended to the Gilbert and Ellice Islands
Treaties extended to the Gold Coast (British colony)
Treaties extended to British Togoland
Treaties extended to the Colony of Jamaica
Treaties extended to British Kenya
Treaties extended to the British Leeward Islands
Treaties extended to the Federated Malay States
Treaties extended to the Unfederated Malay States
Treaties extended to Brunei (protectorate)
Treaties extended to the Crown Colony of Malta
Treaties extended to British Mauritius
Treaties extended to the New Hebrides
Treaties extended to the Colony and Protectorate of Nigeria
Treaties extended to British Cameroon
Treaties extended to the Colony of North Borneo
Treaties extended to Northern Rhodesia
Treaties extended to Nyasaland
Treaties extended to Mandatory Palestine
Treaties extended to the Colony of Sarawak
Treaties extended to the Crown Colony of Seychelles
Treaties extended to the Colony of Sierra Leone
Treaties extended to Swaziland (protectorate)
Treaties extended to British Somaliland
Treaties extended to the Straits Settlements
Treaties extended to Tanganyika (territory)
Treaties extended to the Kingdom of Tonga (1900–1970)
Treaties extended to the Emirate of Transjordan
Treaties extended to the Crown Colony of Trinidad and Tobago
Treaties extended to the Uganda Protectorate
Treaties extended to British Dominica
Treaties extended to the British Windward Islands
Treaties extended to the Sultanate of Zanzibar
1936 in French India